Tak 2: The Staff of Dreams is a video game developed by Avalanche Software and published by THQ for the GameCube, Game Boy Advance, PlayStation 2 and Xbox. It is the sequel to Tak and the Power of Juju and it was released in 2004. The PS2 version was ported to PlayStation Network as a "PS2 Classic" on November 29, 2011, but it was later taken off the store due to THQ's bankruptcy in 2013.

Plot
Following the events of the first game, Tak has now been stuck in a dream for 16 days. Jibolba and Lok ponder how they can wake him up. In reality, Tak is stuck in the Dream World, and is sent by the Dream Juju to fight the Dream Guardian, take The Staff of Dreams, and save the princess. After Tak refuses, he is told that if he does not do this, he will be stuck in the dream forever. As he fights through the Dream World, he escapes through a Rift. When going through the rift, Tak wakes up, and Jibolba and Tak go find Jibolba's brother, JB. Lok wants to go, but Jibolba tells Lok to go fetch his magic sandals. Jibolba turns into a Flea for easy hauling, and they set off.

When Tak and Jibolba reach a dead end, they summon the Belly Juju to get a raft. Belly Juju uses a barrel that Tak got for him, and throws Tak in it, and throws the barrel down river. Lok is once again left behind, and when Belly Juju chokes, Lok has to save him. As Tak and Jibolba go down the fast current, they fall down a huge waterfall, and Tak is knocked out. He wakes up in the Dream World, once again being led by the Dream Juju. Once he makes it to the end, he again enters the real world through a rift. Once in the real world, Tak and Jibolba set off, again. When they reach a bridge, they have to wait for Woodies to pass, but when they do, Lok blows up the bridge, and the Woodies attack. When Tak saves Lok, he summons Mind-Reader Juju. He tells Tak that with three magic stones, he can make Bolas to get across the gap. When Tak does this, he is knocked out by Woodies, again entering the Dream World.

Tak then uses the Bolas to get through the Dream World. For the third time, he gets back to his world using a rift. When he awakes, he is in the holding area in the Gloomleaf Arena, where Woodies train, with Caged Juju. After an argument, Caged Juju finds Lok, and uses a lift key to get up. When up, Lok is hauled off by Woodies, and Tak fights through waves of Woodies. After four rounds, he uses a Woodie Catapult to escape, flying into the Gloomleaf Swamp. When half-way through the swamp, he sees Dead Juju being harassed by Woodies, who steal his Tiki. Tak follows the Woodies to the rafters of the Arena, where Tak steals the Tiki from the Woodie King. He is then chased down river by Woodies, and when he falls down a waterfall, he grabs to a ledge with Dead Juju. When he returns the Tiki, Lok suddenly falls down the waterfall, and the four head off together.

When outside Skyrock Crater, they can see JB's Planetarium. They all stop to smell the flowers, which make them all fall asleep. Tak uses a Woodie Catapult to cause destruction in the Dream World, finally making it to the Tower where the Dream Guardian is at. But, he goes through a rift, and is told that his next sleep will put him in the tower. He and Jibolba wake up, leaving Lok and Dead Juju. Tak and Jibolba go through the Crater, and make it to the Planetarium. But inside, the area is overrun by Power Parasites, and after a long fight, JB is saved. JB tells them that he has never heard of a Dream Juju. So, JB sends Tak into sleep. Tak then enters the tower, and has a long battle with the Dream Guardian. After the battle, Tak gets The Staff of Dreams. The princess appears, and is revealed to be Pins and Needles, and the Dream Juju reveals to be Tlaloc, still in Sheep form. Pins, Needles, and Tak all struggle for the Staff, and Needles gets one half, The Staff of Nightmares, and Tak gets the other, the Dream Shaker. This power causes all to enter the real world, and Pins, Needles, and Tlaloc escape. Tak then begins a chase of them, not watching where he is going, and gets knocked out.

When he wakes up, Tak is in the Moon Juju Interlude, and the Moon Juju was before him. She tells him to choose one of four Spirit Animals. Before she tells Tak the best one, she disappears. Tak chooses, which wakes him up, with new powers.

Tak meets the Giant Misunderstanding and needed help with the rift. The Giant thinks he wants to talk to Rick. Tak repeats the Rick question to the juju to unlock the rift. When he says goodbye, the Giant sings a song.

During the chase, Flora and Fauna grant Tak the ability to become 4 animals.

Tak is tired when he comes to the Dream Fortress. He battles Pins and Needles and gets the other half of the staff. Lok mistakenly gives the half to Tlaloc. Tak battles Tlaloc's army of sheep. After defeating all of the sheep, Tak attacks Tlaloc, knocking him over a ledge and killing him. Jibolba, Dead Juju, and Lok congratulate Tak on his victory and remind him they need to return the staff. Lok questions the appearance of an arm behind Tak which pulls him through a rift and back into the Dream Realm. The arm turns out to belong to Tlaloc who, after being killed in the real world, is now a nightmare creature and has his old body again. He uses the Staff of Nightmare to turn into a monster resembling the Dream Guardian. Tak does the same with his staff to fight Tlaloc. After the battle, the Dream Guardian appears asking for the staff back. Tak apologized to the Dream Guardian who opens a rift to return Tak to the real world. Back in the real world, Jibolba, Lok, and Dead Juju congratulate Tak again before Tlaloc appears again realizing he can never defeat Tak. He decides to instead kill his friends to  eliminate Tak's will to fight. Tak manages to save his friends and defeat Tlaloc a third time. Tak is then waken up by Jibolba and Lok telling him the whole thing was a dream. The three walk off while being spied on by a sheep from Tlaloc's army.

Gameplay
The gameplay is almost identical to the first game, with differences being that Tak's weapon is always on hand, and that mana is represented by a feather count and not a meter. The game takes place in various locations, such as tropical forests, canyons, volcanic areas, snowy tundras and other harsh environments. There are also a number of dimensional stages, in the Dreamworld. Tak gets aid from animals, a number of which did not appear in the first game. In this game, Tak's juju magic is triggered by holding down one button and pressing combos of other buttons. Tak also earns juju powers gradually throughout the game instead of having to seek them out. Tak can also get certain animals to help him out in the real world.

Reception

Tak 2: The Staff of Dreams was given "generally favorable reviews" for the GameCube version, "mixed or average reviews" for the PlayStation 2 and Xbox versions, and "generally unfavorable reviews" for the Game Boy Advance version, according to Metacritic.

The game shipped nearly 1 million units.

Sequel

A third sequel to the series, titled Tak: The Great Juju Challenge was released for the GameCube, Game Boy Advance, Nintendo DS, PlayStation 2 and Xbox in 2005.

References

External links

 Developer Avalanche Software
 
 

2004 video games
3D platform games
Avalanche Software games
Video games about dreams
Video games about shapeshifting
Game Boy Advance games
GameCube games
PlayStation 2 games
PlayStation Network games
Tak and the Power of Juju
THQ games
Video game sequels
Xbox games
Multiplayer and single-player video games
Video games developed in the United States